Mongolian race or Mongol race may refer to:

 Mongols, the indigenous people of Mongolia
 Mongoloid, a historical racial category